Igor Štiks (born 17 September 1977 in Sarajevo) is a novelist and scholar. His novels The Judgment of Richard Richter and A Castle in Romagna have earned him multiple awards; the former has been translated into 15 languages.

Biography

Igor Štiks was born in Sarajevo, Bosnia-Herzegovina, in 1977. During the Yugoslav wars he fled to Croatia and currently lives in Belgrade, Serbia. He has also lived in Paris, Chicago, Edinburgh, and Graz.

He earned his PhD at the Institut d’Études Politiques de Paris and Northwestern University and later worked and taught at the University of Edinburgh and the Faculty of Media and Communications in Belgrade.

His first novel, A Castle in Romagna (Dvorac u Romagni), won the Slavić prize for best first novel in Croatia and was nominated for the IMPAC International Dublin Literary Award for 2006. His second novel The Judgment of Richard Richter, originally published as Elijah's Chair (Elijahova stolica), won the Gjalski and Kiklop Awards for the best novel in Croatia in 2006 and has been translated into fifteen languages including German, Spanish, French, Dutch, Italian, Polish, Czech, Hungarian, Slovenian, Bulgarian, Macedonian, Finnish, Ukrainian and Arabic. In 2017 he published his third novel originally titled Rezalište. 

In his scholarly work, Štiks investigated the topic of citizenship and nationalism in Balkans. Besides many scholarly articles and edited volumes, Štiks published a monograph, Nations and Citizens in Yugoslavia and the Post-Yugoslav States: One Hundred Years of Citizenship (2015). Along with Jo Shaw, he edited the collections Citizenship after Yugoslavia (2013) and Citizenship Rights (2013), and, with Srećko Horvat, Welcome to the Desert of Post-Socialism (2015). Štiks was honored with the prestigious French distinction Chevalier des arts et des lettres for his literary and intellectual achievements.

In addition to winning the Grand Prix of the 2011 Belgrade International Theater Festival for his stage adaptation of Elijah's Chair, Štiks wrote two more plays, Flour in the Veins and Zrenjanin. All three plays were put on stage by one of the leading post-Yugoslav theater directors Boris Liješević.

In 2017, Štiks signed the Declaration on the Common Language of the Croats, Serbs, Bosniaks and Montenegrins.

Personal life

Štiks is married to Dr. Jelena Vasiljevic, who is a research associate at the Institute for Philosophy and Social Theory at University of Belgrade. They live in Belgrade and have a son.

Bibliography

Novels

 The Cuts, (Rezalište), Fraktura Publishing, Zagreb, 2017.
 The Judgment of Richard Richter, originally published as Elijah's Chair (Elijahova stolica ), translated by Ellen Elias Bursac, AmazonCrossing, US, September 2017.
 A Castle in Romagna, (Dvorac u Romagni), translated by Russell Valentino and Tomislav Kuzmanovic, AmazonCrossing, US, March 2018.

Theatre

 Flour in the Veins (Brašno u venama), play, bilingual edition, translated into English by Andrew B. Wachtel, Fraktura, Zagreb, 2016.

Poetry

 History of a Flood (Povijest poplave), Fraktura, Zagreb, 2008.

Scholarship / Non-fiction (author)

 The Right to Rebellion: An Introduction to Anatomy of Civic Resistance (Pravo na pobunu: uvod u anatomiju gradjanske pobune ), with Srećko Horvat, Fraktura, Zagreb, 2010
 Nations and Citizens in Yugoslavia and the Post-Yugoslav States: One Hundred Years of Citizenship, London: Bloomsbury Publishing, 2015.

Scholarship / Non-fiction (editor)

 Citizenship after Yugoslavia, with Jo Shaw, Abingdon: Routledge, 2013.
 Citizenship Rights, with Jo Shaw, Farnham and London: Ashgate, 2013.
 Welcome to the Desert of Post-Socialism: Radical Politics after Yugoslavia, with Srećko Horvat, London: Verso, 2015.

Fiction (editor)

 The Eight Ocular, selected stories by Goran Tribuson (Osmi okular: izabrane priče Gorana Tribusona), edited by Igor Štiks, Ceres, Zagreb, 1998.
 22 in the Shadow: An Anthology of New Croatian Fiction (22 u hladu: antologija nove hrvatske proze 90ih), edited by Igor Štiks and Dalibor Šimpraga, Celeber, Zagreb, 1999.
 The Ultimate Safari through the Empire of English Language (Vrhunski safari kroz carstvo engleskog jezika), edited by Igor Štiks and Dragan Koruga, Naklada MD, Zagreb, 2001.
 New European Poets, edited by Wayne Miller and Kevin Prufer, editor for Croatia, Serbia, Montenegro, and Bosnia-Herzegovina, Graywolf Press, US, 2008.

References

External links
Audio recording of readings by Igor Štiks and Aleš Debeljak at the University of Chicago.

1977 births
Living people
Croatian novelists
Croatian male writers
Male novelists
Writers from Sarajevo
Signatories of the Declaration on the Common Language